M. Sivasankar is an Independent politician from India. He was elected as a member of the Puducherry Legislative Assembly from Ozhukarai (constituency). He defeated N. G. Pannir Selvam of All India N.R. Congress by 819 votes in 2021 Puducherry Assembly election.

References 

Living people
Year of birth missing (living people)
21st-century Indian politicians
People from Puducherry
Independent politicians in India
All India Anna Dravida Munnetra Kazhagam politicians
Puducherry MLAs 2021–2026